Wellington Paranormal is a New Zealand mockumentary comedy horror television series which first aired on 11 July 2018 on TVNZ 2. The series is a spin-off of the 2014 film What We Do in the Shadows and first television series in the franchise, and its lead characters—Officers Minogue and O'Leary—first appeared in the film as a pair of incurious police officers.

Production history
The series was created by  Jemaine Clement and Paul Yates based on characters from What We Do in the Shadows by Clement and Taika Waititi. Waititi and Clement serve as the series' executive producers, while Clement directs four of the six episodes in Season 1. The series was confirmed for a second season of 13 episodes, which aired 6 episodes beginning on 16 October 2019.

A Christmas special aired on 19 December 2019, with the remaining six episodes airing as a new season. Between the special and third series, a sixteen-episode digital web series and public service campaign by New Zealand Police to inform the public on health, safety, and best practices during the COVID-19 pandemic, titled Important COVID-19 Messages from Wellington Paranormal, began airing from 26 March 2020, featuring Andrew Coster and Clarke Gayford as themselves. The lead characters also appeared as part of a 2018 New Zealand Police Recruitment video, and four 2018 Police Safety campaign videos. The third season premiered on 24 February 2021.

Jemaine Clement stated in June 2021 that the fourth season was in post-production. He added: "We're pausing on [Wellington Paranormal], we're not sure we'll be back for a fifth season", while discussing a new series that he and Waititi are currently developing. It was later confirmed that the fourth season would be its last, which premiered on 16 February 2022.

Cast

Main
 Mike Minogue as Officer Kyle Minogue
 Karen O'Leary as Officer O'Leary
 Maaka Pohatu as Sergeant Ruawai Maaka
 Thomas Sainsbury as Constable Parker (season 4, recurring seasons 1-3)

Recurring
 Lynda Topp as Mrs. O'Leary

Guest
 Cori Gonzalez-Macuer as Nick
 Jemaine Clement as Mobot Voice
 Rhys Darby as Anton

Episodes

Series 1 (2018)

Police Recruitment video

Police Summer Safety

Series 2 (2019)

Christmas special (2019)

Important COVID-19 messages (2020)

Series 3 (2021)

Series 4 (2022)

Broadcast and distribution
The series is broadcast on TVNZ 2 with catch-up availability on TVNZ's streaming service TVNZ+. In neighboring Australia, the series is available on SBS on Demand.

In 2021, Sky licensed three seasons of the show for streaming on Now (formerly Now TV) and Sky Q via Sky Comedy in the United Kingdom. In the United States, the series debuted on The CW on 11 July 2021, with episodes available to stream on HBO Max the day after they air.

Reception
Clarke Gayford's appearance on a short Wellington Paranormal video in April 2020 encouraging people who were looking after young children during the COVID-19 pandemic drew some criticism due to his relationship with Prime Minister Jacinda Ardern. National Party Member of Parliament Brett Hudson alleged during an Epidemic Response Committee meeting in early May 2020 that the video risked "politicising" the New Zealand Police. In response, Police Commissioner Andrew Coster defended Gayford's participation on the grounds that he was a well-known television personality who had participated in the television series.

In popular culture 
This article was the topic of conversation in the second episode of series three of the web series "Two Of These People Are Lying" hosted by The Technical Difficulties.

Notes

References

External links

2010s New Zealand television series
2018 New Zealand television series debuts
2020s New Zealand television series
2022 New Zealand television series endings
Fantasy television series
Live action television shows based on films
New Zealand comedy television series
New Zealand mockumentary television series
New Zealand television sitcoms
Police comedy television series
Television shows set in Wellington
TVNZ 2 original programming
Urban fantasy
Wellington in fiction